Camila Klesa (born 19 April 1995) is an Argentine artistic gymnast. She represented Argentina at international competitions. 

She competed at world championships, including the 2014 World Artistic Gymnastics Championships, 2018 World Artistic Gymnastics Championships, and 2018 Pan American Championships.

References 

1995 births
Argentine female artistic gymnasts
Living people